The Melbourne Star was a giant ferris wheel in Melbourne, Australia, which closed in 2021.

Melbourne Star may also refer to:
 MV Melbourne Star (1936), a Blue Star Line refrigerated cargo liner launched in 1936 and sunk in 1943, or its 1947 or 1992 successors
 Melbourne Star, a defunct Australian newspaper
 Melbourne Stars, an Australian men's cricket team
 Melbourne Stars (WBBL), an Australian women's cricket team